Sarajevo is a 2014 German-Austrian biographical television film that depicts the assassination of Archduke Franz Ferdinand of Austria.

Plot 
On 28 June 1914, the Austro-Hungarian heir presumptive Archduke Franz Ferdinand of Austria-Este and his wife Sophie, Duchess of Hohenberg are travelling through Sarajevo on the 525th anniversary of the Battle of Kosovo. As a result of the first attack on the Archduke's life, the Austrian examining magistrate Leo Pfeffer is given the task of capturing the person responsible for the attack. Whilst interrogating the assassin, Pfeffer finds out there has been a second attack on the Archduke and his spouse, in which both were killed. Bosnian Serb assassin Gavrilo Princip is then arrested for his part in the second attack. The magistrate learns that only 36 policemen had been available for patrolling the route the Archduke was travelling on. 

After the first attack, the convoy headed towards the hospital, but an apparent false turn led to the second attack, where the second attacker was located. All of this causes doubts in Pfeffer's mind. Whilst being tortured, one of the perpetrators confesses, and then evidence and witnesses disappear. In the process of his investigations, Pfeffer encounters further inconsistencies, but is forced by his superiors to state the assassination as a conspiracy by Serbia. As Pfeffer turns in his final report to close the film, it is accepted by his superior apathetically, as Austro-Hungarian politicians and military have already decided the assassination of the Archduke would be used as a pretext for an attack on Serbia.

Cast 
 Florian Teichtmeister as Leo Pfeffer
 Reinhard Forcher as Archduke Franz Ferdinand of Austria
 Michaela Ehrenstein as Sophie, Duchess of Hohenberg
 Eugen Knecht as Gavrilo Princip
 Mateusz Dopieralski as Nedeljko Čabrinović
 Erwin Steinhauer as Oskar Potiorek
 Heino Ferch as Dr. Herbert Sattler
 Melika Foroutan as Marija Jeftanovic
 Edin Hasanovic as Danilo Ilić
 Simon Hatzl as Polizeichef Strametz
 Martin Leutgeb as Polizist Schimpf
 Juraj Kukura as Stojan Jeftanovic
 Karin Lischka as Frau Ofner
 Juergen Maurer as Justizchef Fiedler
 Michael Menzel as Sekretär Körner
 Friedrich von Thun as Sektionsrat Wiesner
 Dominik Warta as Peter Dörre

Production 
The film is a German-Austrian cooperation between German television channel ZDF and Austrian channel ORF. It was commissioned as part of the 100th anniversary of the start of the First World War.

Awards and nominations

The film received the following awards and nominations:

 Baden-Baden TV Film Festival 2014
 3Sat Zuschauerpreis: Andreas Prochaska
 German Television Academy Award 2014
 Best Leading Actor: Florian Teichmeister
 Best Script: Martin Ambrosch
 Best Casting: Nicole Schmied
 Jupiter Award 2015
 Best German TV Actor: Heino Ferch

Reviews 
" An oppressive storyline" - TV Spielfilm

"The ZDF / ORF co-production defies the assassination attempt of Sarajevo, whose sequence and its consequences are generally known, yet still of value compared to a documentary on the topic" - tittelbach.tv 

The Hollywood Reporter called it a  "handsome-looking and well-acted feature"

References

External links 
 
 

German biographical films
2014 television films
2014 films
Films about the assassination of Archduke Franz Ferdinand of Austria
German World War I films
Films set in Sarajevo
German television films
Films about assassinations
Austrian television films
2010s German-language films
German-language television shows
Cultural depictions of Archduke Franz Ferdinand of Austria
Cultural depictions of Gavrilo Princip
2010s German films
ZDF original programming